The following is a list of the MuchMusic Video Awards winners for Best International Artist Video. Lady Gaga and Rihanna hold the record for most wins, with 2 each.

References

MuchMusic Video Awards